Women Who Dare is a 1928 American silent drama film directed by Burton L. King and starring Helene Chadwick, Charles Delaney and Frank Beal.

Premise
A young woman from a wealthy family goes to work in a hospital in the slums, and campaigns for improved conditions for the poor.

Cast
 Helene Chadwick as Stella Mowbray 
 Charles Delaney as Ralph Miles 
 Frank Beal as Edgar Mowbray 
 Jack Richardson as Frank Lawson 
 Henry A. Barrows as Dr. Alden 
 James Quinn as Benny, the Spider 
 James A. Fitzgerald as Spike Carson 
 Grace Elliott as Satin Maggie 
 Margaret McWade as Mrs. Kelly

References

Bibliography
 Munden, Kenneth White. The American Film Institute Catalog of Motion Pictures Produced in the United States, Part 1. University of California Press, 1997.

External links

1928 films
1928 drama films
Silent American drama films
Films directed by Burton L. King
American silent feature films
1920s English-language films
American black-and-white films
1920s American films